The 1983 Princeton Tigers football team was an American football team that represented Princeton University during the 1983 NCAA Division I-AA football season. Princeton finished sixth in the Ivy League.

In their sixth year under head coach Frank Navarro, the Tigers compiled a 4–6 record but outscored opponents 285 to 277. Steven K. Stearns and Jeffrey J. Urbany were the team captains.

Princeton's 2–5 conference record placed sixth in the Ivy League standings. The Tigers were outscored 179 to 169 by Ivy opponents. 

Princeton played its home games at Palmer Stadium on the university campus in Princeton, New Jersey.

Schedule

References

Princeton
Princeton Tigers football seasons
Princeton Tigers football